ROKS Chungmugong Yi Sun-sin (DDH-975) is a  in the Republic of Korea Navy. She is named after the Joseon Korean admiral Yi Sun-sin with his posthumous name, Chungmugong, literally “Lord of Loyal Valor”.

Design 
The KDX-II is part of a much larger build up program aimed at turning the ROKN into a blue-water navy. It is said to be the first stealthy major combatant in the ROKN and was designed to significantly increase the ROKN's capabilities.

Construction and career 
ROKS Chungmugong Yi Sun-sin was launched on 22 May 2002 by Daewoo Shipbuilding and commissioned on 2 December 2003.

Gallery

References

Chungmugong Yi Sun-shin-class destroyers
2002 ships
Ships built by Daewoo Shipbuilding & Marine Engineering